The 1971 Oregon Webfoots football team represented the University of Oregon during the 1971 NCAA University Division football season. Home games were played in Eugene at Autzen Stadium.

Led by fifth-year head coach Jerry Frei, the Ducks were 5–6 overall and 2–4 in the Pacific-8 Conference. They did not play UCLA and lost the Civil War to Oregon State for an eighth consecutive year.

Oregon was led by junior quarterback Dan Fouts and senior All-American halfback Bobby Moore (Ahmad Rashad), the fourth overall pick of the 1972 NFL Draft, taken by the St. Louis Cardinals. Rashad played ten seasons in the NFL, primarily as a wide receiver with the Minnesota Vikings.

Two months after the season, Frei resigned as head coach on January 19, 1972, and assistant coach Dick Enright was promoted two weeks later.

Schedule

Roster

All-conference

Four Oregon seniors were named to the All-Pacific-8 team: halfback Bobby Moore, tackle Tom Drougas, guard John McKean, and defensive back Bill Drake. It was the third straight year on the first team for Moore.

References

External links
 Game program: Oregon vs. Washington State at Spokane – October 30, 1971
 Game video (color) – Oregon vs. Washington State at Spokane – October 30, 1971

Oregon
Oregon Ducks football seasons
Oregon Webfoots football